Basketball Northern Territory (BNT) is the governing body of basketball in the Northern Territory, Australia.

BNT was founded as Northern Territory Basketball Association (NTBA) in 1948. Basketball was administered by NTBA until 1963, when its Constitution was amended and the Darwin Amateur Basketball Association (DABA) was formed. The lease on Darwin's main basketball court at Daly Street was transferred from NTBA to DABA in 1974. In the 1980s DABA became known as Darwin Basketball Association (DBA) and in the 1990s NTBA became known as Basketball Northern Territory.

In 2022, the NBL1 North had a club from Darwin – the Darwin Salties – represented for the first time under the joint management of DBA and BNT. It saw the NBL1 become the first Australian sport league to have clubs based in and playing out of every state and territory in Australia.

Major affiliated associations

References

External links

Official BNT website

Basketball governing bodies in Australia
Sports governing bodies in the Northern Territory
1948 establishments in Australia
Sports organizations established in 1948